The KiHa 187 series (キハ187系, Kiha-187-kei) is a diesel multiple unit (DMU) train type operated by West Japan Railway Company (JR-West) on Super Oki, Super Matsukaze and Super Inaba limited express services.

Operations
KiHa 187-0/10 series
 Super Oki
 Super Matsukaze

KiHa 187-500 series
 Super Inaba

Formation
Each set consists of two cars.

References

External links

 Nippon Sharyo Kiha 187 

187 series
West Japan Railway Company
Nippon Sharyo multiple units
Niigata Transys rolling stock